Emilio de Villota Jr. (born 9 December 1981) is a Spanish racing driver, son of former Aurora champion Emilio de Villota and younger brother of the late María de Villota. He has competed in such series as Euroseries 3000, F3000 International Masters, Porsche Supercup and the Spanish Formula Three Championship.

He was born on 9 December 1980. His father, Emilio de Villota, competed in Formula One racing. His sister, Maria de Villota, was also a race car driver. in the 2008 Spanish Formula 3 championship, he was Pons team manager. He was still Pons team manager in 2015.

References

External links

 

1981 births
Living people
Spanish racing drivers
Euroformula Open Championship drivers
Sportspeople from Madrid
Formula Palmer Audi drivers
International Formula 3000 drivers
Auto GP drivers
Porsche Supercup drivers

Racing Engineering drivers
De Villota Motorsport drivers